Lockton Companies Inc. is an American company that provides insurance, risk management, employee benefits and retirement services. It is the world's largest privately held insurance brokerage firm. In addition to its Kansas City, Missouri headquarters, Lockton operates more than 100+ locations in 125 countries. Lockton currently employs more than 8,500 people worldwide.

The company was founded by Jack Lockton in 1966 and has since become the world’s 8th largest insurance brokerage firm. Lockton serves a wide array of industries with services that include risk management, casualty, surety, professional indemnity and more. For more than 50 years, Lockton posted organic growth, with global revenues reaching more than $2.16 billion in fiscal 2021.

History
In 1966 Jack Lockton (1942–2004) founded Lockton Insurance. He was 24 years old and had just graduated from the University of Missouri Kansas City in 1964 with a degree in Economics. Prior to attending the University of Missouri he transferred from Westminster College in Missouri. Prior to founding Lockton Insurance, Jack Lockton worked as an underwriter for a surety bonding company where he specialized in serving contractors.

Lockton Company started when Jack partnered with his parents to share office expenses and have money to hire office help. He was able to persuade established people in the industry to leave their positions to work with him, including Gary Hambright who had worked with Jack at his previous job. In 1976 Jack’s brother David M. Lockton joined the company as Lockton’s ninth employee. David later served as President then CEO. From 2003-2020, David served as the company’s Chairman until Jack's son Ron Lockton took over in May 2020. Before taking over as Chair, Ron served as CEO from 2017-2020 and held numerous other roles during his 30+ years with the company. 

Lockton began expanding the business across the country after establishing a successful office in Denver in 1979. It focused on finding successful business leaders in new areas and recruiting them to establish a new office. This is still Lockton's business model today.

In 2006, Lockton expanded globally with the acquisition of Alexander Forbes International Risk Services, making it the world's largest privately owned broker.

References

External links
 Official Website

Companies based in Kansas City, Missouri
Insurance companies of the United States
Financial services companies established in 1966
Privately held companies based in Missouri
Financial services companies of the United States
1966 establishments in Missouri